Elaphroconcha is a genus of air-breathing land snails, terrestrial pulmonate gastropod mollusks in the family Dyakiidae.

The generic name Elaphroconcha consist of Ancient Greek word ἐλαφρός (elaphrós) that means "light" and of Ancient Greek word κόγχη (konche) that means "shell" (conch).

Species 
The genus Elaphroconcha includes 10 species:

 Elaphroconcha internota (E. Smith, 1898) - the type species
 Elaphroconcha javacensis Férrusac, 1821 - photo
 Elaphroconcha patens E. von Martens, 1898

Description 
Gerard Pierre Laurent Kalshoven Gude described the genus like this:

References
This article incorporates public domain text from the reference.

External links 
 http://www.ne.jp/asahi/dexter/sinister/gallery/genera/Elaphroconcha.html

Dyakiidae